The 2010–11 GNF2 is the 49th season of Botola 2, the second division of the Moroccan football league. The season commenced on the 25 August 2010 and concluded on the 30 May 2011.

Team movement

Teams relegated from 2009–10 Botola
 IZK Khemisset
 Association Salé

Teams promoted to 2010–11 Botola
 JSK Chabab Kasba Tadla
 Chabab Rif Hoceima

Teams relegated to 2010–11 GNFA 1 
 Chabab Atlas Khénifra
 Renaissance de Settat
 USK Sidi Kacem

Teams promoted from 2009–10 GNFA 1 
Raja Beni Mallal
Union Sportive Aït Melloul
Hilal Nador

Competing clubs

Table

See also 
 2010–11 Botola

External links 
 Soccerway.com Botola2 Webpage

GNF 2 seasons
Moro
2010–11 in Moroccan football